Jack or Jackie Roberts may refer to:

Jack Roberts (actor) (born 1979), American actor
Jack Roberts (American football) (1910–1981), American football player
Jack Roberts (Canadian football) (c. 1930–2013), Canadian football player
Jack Roberts (climber) (1954–2012), American rock and ice climber
Jack Roberts (footballer, born 1867) (1867–1921), Australian rules footballer
Jack Roberts (footballer, born 1873), (1873–19??) English footballer
Jack Roberts (footballer, born 1910) (1910–1985), English footballer
Jack Roberts (footballer, born 1926) (1926–1965), Australian rules footballer
Jack Roberts (footballer, born 1935), Australian rules footballer
Jack Roberts (judge) (1910–1988), American judge of the United States District Court
Jack Roberts (politician) (born 1952), American politician
Jack Roberts (rugby union) (born 1991), Welsh rugby union player
Jack Roberts (unionist) (1885–1962), New Zealand trade unionist and political activist
Jackie Roberts (1918–2001), Welsh international footballer
Jackie Roberts (umpire) (1912–1991), Barbadian cricket umpire

See also
John Roberts (disambiguation)